Stanislav Prýl (November 23, 1942 – March 19, 2015) was an ice hockey player who played for the Czechoslovak national team. He won a bronze medal at the 1964 Winter Olympics. He was born in Pardubice.

References

External links

1942 births
2015 deaths
Czechoslovak ice hockey right wingers
HC Dukla Jihlava players
HC Dynamo Pardubice players
Ice hockey players at the 1964 Winter Olympics
Medalists at the 1964 Winter Olympics
Olympic bronze medalists for Czechoslovakia
Olympic ice hockey players of Czechoslovakia
Olympic medalists in ice hockey
Sportspeople from Pardubice
Czech ice hockey right wingers